Alpine Hose Company No. 2 was organized in Georgetown, Colorado.  Its building at 507 5th St. in Georgetown, dating from 1874 was listed on the National Register of Historic Places in 1973.

The building consists of two structures:  a hose house which was built in 1878, and a bell tower built in 1880.

Notes

References

Fire stations on the National Register of Historic Places in Colorado
National Register of Historic Places in Clear Creek County, Colorado
Government buildings completed in 1874
1874 establishments in Colorado Territory
Bell towers in the United States
Fire stations completed in the 19th century